Richard Elliott Daniel Storer (born 9 May 1948) is an English former first-class cricketer.

Storer was born at Nottingham in May 1948. He later studied at Brasenose College at the University of Oxford, where he played first-class cricket for Oxford University in 1972, making four appearances against Hampshire, Derbyshire, Middlesex and Nottinghamshire. He failed to impress at first-class level, scoring just 13 runs from six innings.

References

External links

1948 births
Living people
Cricketers from Nottingham
Alumni of Brasenose College, Oxford
English cricketers
Oxford University cricketers